Jason Isaacson (born May 20, 1971) is a Minnesota politician and member of the Minnesota Senate. A member of the Minnesota Democratic–Farmer–Labor Party (DFL), he was elected to the Minnesota Senate in 2016, after serving in the Minnesota House of Representatives for four years. He represents District 42 in the central Twin Cities metropolitan area, including Arden Hills, Gem Lake, Little Canada, Mounds View, Shoreview, Vadnais Heights, and parts of Roseville, Spring Lake Park, and Blaine.

Education and career
Isaacson attended North Dakota State University, graduating with a B.S. in political science and later a M.A. in communication studies. He is currently a Ph.D. candidate at the University of Minnesota and an instructor at Century College teaching Interpersonal Communication and Intercultural Communications. Isaacson also teaches at North Hennepin Community College and has taught at Johns Hopkins and George Washington University.

Minnesota Legislature
Isaacson is an advocate for creating living wage jobs, expanding job skills, and affordable housing for all.

Isaacson was first elected to the Minnesota House of Representatives in 2012 and re-elected in 2014. He was elected to the Minnesota Senate in the November 2016 general election and assumed office on January 3, 2017, succeeding retiring state Senator Bev Scalze representing District 42.

92nd Legislative Session (2021-2022), Committees: Education Finance and Policy, Labor and Industry Policy, Mining and Forestry Policy, Ranking Minority Chair for Redistricting.

91st Legislative Session (2019-2020) (second half of Senate term), Committees: Agriculture, Rural Development, and Housing Policy, Higher Education Finance and Policy, Human Services Reform Finance and Policy, Jobs and Economic Growth Finance and Policy.

90th Legislative Session (2017-2018), Committees: Agriculture, Rural Development, and Housing Policy, Higher Education Finance and Policy, Jobs and Economic Growth Finance and Policy.

89th Legislative Session (2015-2016), Committees: Higher Education Policy & Finance, Job Growth & Energy Affordability Policy & Finance, Rules & Legislative Administration.

88th Legislative Session (2013-2014), Committees: Education Policy, Environment and Natural Resources Policy, Housing Finance and Policy, Jobs and Economic Development Finance and Policy. Leadership Position: Assistant Majority Leader.

Personal life
Isaacson is married to his wife, Cynthia, and they reside in Shoreview, Minnesota with their three children.

Electoral history

References

External links

Official Minnesota Senate website
Official campaign website

1971 births
Living people
People from Moorhead, Minnesota
People from Shoreview, Minnesota
North Dakota State University alumni
Democratic Party members of the Minnesota House of Representatives
21st-century American politicians
Democratic Party Minnesota state senators